Nickelodeon Poland, also simply called Nick Poland, is a children's channel broadcasting in Poland. The channel broadcasts 24/7. All animated shows are dubbed into Polish and live-action Polish lector. On 1 march 2010, Nickelodeon Poland changed its logo and switched to Nickelodeon CEE 2 October 2012 Nickelodeon CEE Again became Nickelodeon Poland. 17 April 2021 Nickelodeon Poland once again became Nickelodeon CEE

History

Start as a programming block on Fantastic (1999-2001) 
Before the Polish Nickelodeon channel, Nickelodeon aired as a 12-hour block on Fantastic from 1999 to 2001 but was closed after being deemed a failure on 1 July 2001.

In 2000, the programme "ME-TV" began to be published, it was developed by Nickelodeon Russia specifically for Poland.

Channel (2008-present) 
On 10 July 2008, Nickelodeon returned in Poland as a full-time channel.

Controversy

On 6 June 2018, several episodes of The Loud House were banned from airing due to the complaint submitted to the Polish National Broadcasting Council by Ordo Iuris, a notable Catholic law office, about the LGBT themes presented in the series, but are still available on streaming platforms.

References

External links 
 Official site
 Nickelodeon Junior Poland

Television channels in Poland
Television channels and stations established in 2008
Children's television networks
Poland
1999 establishments in Poland
2001 disestablishments in Poland
2021 disestablishments in Poland
2008 establishments in Poland
Polish-language television stations